Caleb "Kairo" Schylander (1895–1977) was a Swedish association football inside forward who earned seven caps with the Sweden national football team.  He played professionally in Sweden and the United States player.

In 1913, Schylander began his career with IFK Göteborg.  In 1924, he moved to the United States where he signed with Indiana Flooring of the American Soccer League.  In his first season (1924–25), he scored thirteen goals in forty-three games.  By his third and final season with Indiana, both his appearances and goalscoring had fallen to sixteen games and two goals.

Schylander earned seven caps with the Sweden national football team between 1915 and 1918.

External links

References

1895 births
1977 deaths
American Soccer League (1921–1933) players
IFK Göteborg players
Indiana Flooring players
Swedish footballers
Swedish expatriate footballers
Sweden international footballers
Association football inside forwards